Cactus Lake is a Saskatchewan hamlet located about 8 kilometres from the Alberta-Saskatchewan border. Nearby communities include Macklin, Luseland and Major. The histories of the families of Cactus Lake and surrounding communities are detailed in Prairie Legacy: Grosswerder and Surrounding Districts, by the Grosswerder and Districts New Horizons Heritage Group, published in 1980.

Notable people 
Notable people from Cactus Lake include:
 Donald Oborowsky, president and chief executive officer of Edmonton-based Waiward Steel Fabricators, Ltd. 
 Fr. Ronald Rolheiser, president of the Oblate School of Theology in San Antonio, Texas,

References 

Former designated places in Saskatchewan
Hamlets in Saskatchewan
Heart's Hill No. 352, Saskatchewan
Division No. 13, Saskatchewan